Pabal, is a panchayat village in Shirur Taluka in Pune district of state of Maharashtra, India. It is located in the northwest corner of the taluka, bordering on Ambegaon Taluka to the north and Khed Taluka to the west. It lies on the left (north) bank of the Vel River.  Pabal is 39.34 km far from the district's main city of Pune.

Nearby villages of Pabal with distance are Pur (3.792 km), Pur (3.792 km), Kanhersar (4.552 km), Kendur (5.564 km), Dhamari (6.302 km), Wadgaon Pir (6.617 km), Gosasi (7.471 km),Kanhur Mesai, Morachi Chincholi Shirur, Saradwadi, Shindodi, Shirasgaon Kata, Sonesangavi, Takali Bhima, Takali Haji, Talegaon Dhamdhere, Tardobachiwadi, Uralgaon, Vitthalwadi, Shikrapur (20 km). This is also the burial  place of Mastani.

Education

 श्री भैरवनाथ विद्या मंदिर पाबळ Shri Bhairavnath Vidya Mandir, Pabal
Vigyan Ashram
Padmamani Jain Mahavidyalaya, Pabal.

Gallery

Religion
The majority of the population in the village is Hindu.

The village also has an ancient Jain temple. Devotees from Pune and Mumbai flock here for pujan and darshan quite frequently.

Economy
The majority of the population has farming as their primary occupation.

See also

 Vigyan Ashram
 Shirur, Maharashtra
 Shri Bhairavnath Vidya Mandir, Pabal

Notes and references

External links
 Vigyan Ashram

Villages in Pune district